The Austin North House, also known as The Castle, is a historic house in Billings, Montana. It was built in 1902-1903 for Austin North, his wife née Hattie Swartz, and their five children. North was a native of Iowa and he split his time between Billings and San Antonio, Texas. He was the president of the North Real Estate Investment Company, a real estate, mortgage and insurance company. He died in 1928.  By the 1970s, the house was in mixed use, with stores on the first floor and residential apartments on the upper floors.

The house was designed in the Medieval style by Link & Haire, a prolific Montana-based architectural firm. It has been listed on the National Register of Historic Places since November 23, 1977.

References

Houses on the National Register of Historic Places in Montana
National Register of Historic Places in Yellowstone County, Montana
Houses completed in 1902